The Moïse river (French: Rivière à Moïse) is located in the Laurentides Wildlife Reserve in Upper Batiscanie in the administrative area of the Capitale-Nationale, about  northwest of Quebec City. Moïse River is part of unorganized territory of Lac-Croche in Regional County Municipality (RCM) of Jacques-Cartier.

Lakes Moïses, Rainville, Charcoal and Montendre discharge into the Moïse river, which in turn flows into the Lightning River (south-west) downstream of the mouth of Batiscan Lake, Quebec in addition to two large notes, the course of the river to Moïse is not winding over a length of about 18 km, between the mouth of Moïse lake and Lightning River.

Toponymy 

The name " River Moïse" was formalized on December 5, 1968, at the Commission de toponymie du Québec. According to the commission, the surveyor's report clearly indicates Félix Pagé the presence of the river and Lake Moïse in 1887. Since 1886, when the lake is located in the large private estate Triton Tract Alexander Luders Light (1822–1894), former chief engineer of the railways to the Quebec government. In 1893, Triton has been converted Tract club hunting and fishing. Now, it is designated the Triton Fish and Game Club. A few years later, several highly renowned personalities from the Canada, the United States or even Great Britain, came to fish, such as John D. Rockefeller, Theodore Roosevelt, Wilfrid Laurier, Lomer Gouin and Winston Churchill.

In August 1887, Edward Panet, notary Saint-Raymond goes to Moïse Lake (Quebec), with three friends to fish, assisted by four guides, including Moïses and Alexis Christmas. Moses is a Huron Jeune Lorette, today Wendake, a suburb north of the Quebec City. The name of one of the guides there a link with the name of both the river and the lake? For now, there is no evidence to support this thesis corborative.

See also 

 Zec de la Rivière-Blanche
 Batiscanie, Quebec
 Batiscan River
 Batiscan Lake, Quebec
 Lightning River
 Portneuf Wildlife Reserve
 Laurentides Wildlife Reserve

MRC and municipalities :
 La Jacques-Cartier Regional County Municipality
 La Tuque
 Municipality of Lac-Édouard

References 

Rivers of Capitale-Nationale
Laurentides Wildlife Reserve